Omiza lycoraria is a geometer moth in subfamily Ennominae first described by Achille Guenée in 1857. It is found in Peninsular Malaysia, Borneo and Sumatra. The species is most common in lowland forests but may be found in lower and upper montane forests up to about 1800 m.

References

Hypochrosini
Moths of Borneo
Moths described in 1857